Monte Rosa is a mountain massif in the eastern part of the Pennine Alps. It is between Italy's (Piedmont and Aosta Valley) and Switzerland's (Valais). Monte Rosa is the second highest mountain in the Alps and western Europe, after Mont Blanc.

The group is on the watershed between central and southern Europe and has a prominence of 2165 meters which is ranked fifth in the Alps.

The Monte Rosa massif has four faces. Three are in Italy: the Liskamm heading above the Val de Gressoney; the Valsesian face above Alagna Valsesia at the upper part of the Valle della Sesia; and the steep, big east wall above Macugnaga in the Valle Anzasca. The Swiss north-western face has several glaciers (with one of the largest Alpine glaciers) flowing towards the Mattertal with Zermatt.

Some other over 4000 m peaks such as Piramide Vincent, Punta Giordani, and Corno Nero are wholly in Italy. Monte Rosa is the highest mountain of both Switzerland and the Pennine Alps and is also the second-highest mountain of the Alps and Europe outside the Caucasus.

The north-west side of the central Monte Rosa massif, with its enormous ice slopes and seracs, constitutes the boundary and upper basin of the large Gorner Glacier, which descends towards Zermatt and merges with its nowadays much larger tributary, the Grenzgletscher, right below the Monte Rosa Hut on the lower end of the visible western wing. The Grenzgletscher is an impressive glacier formation between the western wing of the mountain and Liskamm, a ridge on its southwestern side on the Swiss-Italian border. On the eastern side, in Italy, the mountain falls away in an almost vertical  wall of granite and ice, the biggest in Europe, overlooking Macugnaga and several smaller glaciers.

Monte Rosa was studied by pioneering geologists and explorers, including Leonardo da Vinci in the late fifteenth century and Horace-Bénédict de Saussure in the late eighteenth century. Following a long series of attempts beginning in the early nineteenth century, Monte Rosa's summit, then still called Höchste Spitze ( 'highest peak'), was first reached in 1855 from Zermatt by a party of eight climbers led by three guides. The great east wall was first climbed in 1872, from Macugnaga.

Each summer many climbers set out from the Monte Rosa Hut on the mountain's west wing for one of its summits via the normal route or for the Margherita Hut on the Signalkuppe, used as a research station. Many tourists and hikers also come each year to the Gornergrat on the northwest side of the massif, to see the panorama that extends over the giants of the Alps, from Monte Rosa to the Matterhorn.

Etymology 
Though the Italian  as well as the French  both mean "pink", the name is a false cognate derived from the Franco-Provençal Valdôtain patois word rouése, meaning "glacier". On old maps as late as 1740, the mountain was named Monte Bosa and even Monte Biosa by the inhabitants of Val Sesia. The name Mon Boso which appears in Leonardo da Vinci's notebooks very likely designated the same mountain. From Zermatt the mountain was formerly known under the name Gornerhorn (in Walliser German,  “Large/Strong Horn”). The name gorner is still used for the western ridge that is thrown out from the main mass (Gornergrat) and the glacier that lies at its foot (Gornergletscher) but not used for the mountain itself anymore. Nowadays, in German, the Italian Monte Rosa is used instead (Monte Rosa-Gletscher, Monte Rosa-Hütte, etc.).

Geography and climate

Geographic setting and description 

Monte Rosa cover areas on both sides of the border between the Swiss canton of Valais and the Italian regions of Piedmont and Aosta Valley. The main summit of Monte Rosa is the Dufourspitze. The different sides of the mountain greatly differ from each other. The Swiss west side is almost completely covered by large glaciers, tributaries of the  large Gorner Glacier, descending progressively with gentle slopes and forming a large uninhabited glacial valley. The Italian east side consists of a  wall overlooking Macugnaga, whose snows feed the Belvedere Glacier at its base. The southeast face, culminating at the Signalkuppe, overlooks the piedmontese Valsesia and the Val de Gressoney in the autonomous region of Aosta Valley.

The mountain is mainly covered by eternal snows and glaciers, except for its summit which is a rocky ridge orientated west–east, near to and perpendicular to the main watershed between Switzerland and Italy (the river basins of the Rhône and the Po on the Swiss and Italian side, respectively). The connecting point between them is the Grenzgipfel right on the border, and therefore also the highest peak on the Italian side. Thus Monte Rosa is the highest mountain in the Alps whose summit is not on the main alpine watershed, although it is off by only 150 metres. The Silbersattel and Grenzsattel are the passes located north and south to the summit. The three main secondary summits of Monte Rosa are (from north to south): the Nordend (4,609 m; north of the Dufourspitze), the Zumsteinspitze (4,563 m; south of the Dufourspitze) and the Signalkuppe (4,554 m), all of them being positioned right on the Swiss-Italian border. Other secondary summits are the Parrotspitze (4,432 m), the Ludwigshöhe (4,341 m) and the Vincentpiramid (4,215 m). All of them originally have German names, since even the Italian valleys used to be by German-based Walsers inhabited valleys.

Several perpendicular secondary ridges are connected to the central massif dividing the glaciers that descend towards the Matter Valley. The ridge called Weissgrat connecting the Nordend with the Schwarzberghorn presents a wall of formidable precipices towards the east, but falls away in a gentle slope to the west. For a breadth of a few kilometres the upper snow-fields of the Weissgrat lie almost unbroken upon this slope, but as they begin to descend towards the Matter Valley they are divided into two ice streams (the upper Gorner Glacier and the Findel Glacier) by a ridge which gradually emerges from the névé, and finally presents a rather bold front to the glaciers on either side. The highest points of this ridge, appearing insignificant by contrast with the grand objects around, is the Stockhorn (3,532 m) and the lower Gornergrat at 3,090 m. On their south sides is the lower Gorner Glacier, formed by the confluence of all the major (Gornergletscher and Grenzgletscher) and minor tributaries descending from the north, west and south sides of the central Monte Rosa massif, while on the north side the Findel Glacier descends near to the hamlet of Findeln.

Monte Rosa is one of the high mountains surrounding the  Matter Valley south of Stalden. On the southwest to west are Liskamm, Zwillinge with Castor and Pollux, the Breithorn and the Matterhorn; on the north are the Weisshorn and the Dom.

Geography 
The extended range of Monte Rosa, which appears to originate in the intersection of two axes of great elevation, throws out a number of ridges that radiate afar and gradually subside into the plain of northern Italy, covering a relatively large area. There is no convenient mode of subdividing the range. However, the natural limits of the district can be defined on the north side by the two branches of the Visp torrent. Following the west branch through the Mattertal, crossing the Theodul Pass, descending by the Valtournanche to Châtillon and to Ivrea, and passing around the base of the mountains by Arona, along Lake Maggiore, and up the valley of the Toce, to Vogogna, then ascending by the Val Anzasca to the Monte Moro Pass, the circuit is completed by the descent through the Saastal to Stalden. Within the line so traced, exceeding 450 km in length, all the ranges properly belonging to this group are included.

The direction of the ranges and the depressions offers a marked contrast to that prevailing throughout the adjoining regions of the Alps. Unless in a small part of the Italian valleys, the direction here is either parallel or perpendicular to the meridian. Monte Rosa itself lies near the intersection of a great north and south ridge, extending from the Balfrin through the Mischabelhörner, and the highest peaks of the mountain itself, to the Vincent Pyramide, and thence through the range that bounds the Valle di Gressoney, nearly to Ivrea, with the transverse range lying between the Dent d'Herens and the Pizzo Bianco near Macugnaga. The minor ridges on the north side of the border are parallel to this latter range, with their corresponding depressions occupied by the glaciers of Gorner and Findelen.

On clear days the mountainous massif of Monte Rosa provides a striking view from the Po plain, particularly its upper reaches in western Lombardy and eastern Piedmont. It dominates the horizon, towering between other lesser Alpine peaks as a prominent, multi-pointed, razor-sharp bulge, its permanent glaciers shining under the sun.

"It is the opinion of many of the most competent judges, that for grandeur, beauty, and variety, the valleys descending from Monte Rosa are entitled to preeminence over every other portion of the Alps, and perhaps, if we regard the union of those three elements, over every other mountain region in the world." – John Ball (first president of the Alpine Club)

The massif is the border between Switzerland and Italy, though glacial melt has caused some alterations to the border. These changes were ratified by the two countries in 2009 and will continue to be subject to change as melting continues.

Geology 
The entire massif consists mainly of granite and granite gneiss (a metamorphic rock with foliations). The Monte Rosa Nappe lies below the Zermatt-Saas zone and is part of the Penninic nappes in the Briançonnais microcontinent zone, although its paleographic origin is controversial and is sometimes assigned to the Sub-Penninic nappes. Rocks in the paragneiss of the Monte Rosa Nappe record eclogite-facies metamorphism. The deformation of the Monte Rosa granites indicates a depth of subduction of about 60 km. They were brought to the surface by tectonic uplift, which still continues today.

Climate 
Being the highest point in Switzerland, Monte Rosa is also one of the most extreme places. Owing to the frequent prevalence of a high wind from the east or north-east, and the slow pace at which it is possible to move when near the top, precautions against cold are particularly necessary when climbing Monte Rosa.

Tourism 

The Monte Rosa massif is popular for mountaineering, hiking, skiing and snowboarding. It hosts several ski resorts with long pistes. Plateau Rosa, about 3,500 metres high above sea level, is a summer ski resort, with snow all year round due to the altitude. The Plateau Rosa is connected via aerial tramway to Cervinia and to Zermatt via the Klein Matterhorn. The western fringes of the massif reach the Zermatt ski domain. Gressoney, Champoluc, Alagna Valsesia and Macugnaga (under the east face, intensely glaciated and 2,500 metres high) are the main mountain and ski resorts that surround Monte Rosa along its southern side. Monte Rosa is not technically difficult to climb, but can be quite dangerous due to its great altitude and sudden weather changes, as well as crevasses in its extensive glaciers – one of the major glaciated areas in the Alps. Many alpinists who died climbing Monte Rosa are buried in the Old Church cemetery in Macugnaga.

Trekking 
The Monte Rosa tour can be completed by trekkers in about 10 days. The circuit follows many ancient trails that have linked the Swiss and Italian valleys for centuries. The circuit includes larch forests, alpine meadows, balcony trails and a glacial crossing. It connects seven valleys embracing different cultures: the German-speaking high Valais, the Arpitan speaking Aosta Valley and the valleys of Lombardy and Piedmont.

The Monte Rosa massif

Peaks 
Usually these peaks are considered to be part of the Monte Rosa massif:

Glaciers 
Usually these glaciers are considered to be part of the Monte Rosa massif:

Gornergletscher
Monte-Rosa-Gletscher
Grenzgletscher
Findelgletscher
Lysgletscher
Endregletscher
Ghiacciaio di Bors
Ghiacciaio delle Piode
Ghiacciaio della Sesia
Ghiacciaio delle Vigne
Ghiacciaio Sud delle Loccie
Ghiacciaio Nord delle Loccie
Ghiacciaio del Signal
Ghiacciaio del M. Rosa
Ghiacciaio del Nordend
Ghiacciaio del Belvedere

Panorama

See also 

 List of mountains of Valais
 High Alps
 List of most isolated mountains of Switzerland

References

External links 

Video and photos of a climb up to Capanna Margherita
Gressoney Monterosa – www.gressoneyonline.it
Rifugi Monterosa – Mountain Huts on Monte Rosa
Tour Monte Rosa – Matterhorn
Photos of Monte Rosa, Italian side
Monte Rosa, some Photos, incl. panoramic view, Swiss side
Freeride route from Monte Rosa with map and pictures
Virtual field trip to Colle Gnifetti on Monte Rosa

 
Mountain ranges of the Alps
Mountain ranges of Switzerland
Mountain ranges of Italy
Mountain ranges of Piedmont
Mountains of the Alps
Pennine Alps
Mountains of Switzerland
Mountains of Valais
Mountains of Aosta Valley
Alpine four-thousanders
Four-thousanders of Switzerland
Highest points of Swiss cantons
Mountains partially in Italy